Christopher Szygiel, better known by his handle PC Chris, is an American former professional Super Smash Bros. Melee player. He is best known for defeating top professional player Ken Hoang in grand finals of MLG New York 2006, in what was at the time considered one of the greatest upsets in competitive Melee history. Szygiel was documented in an episode of the 2013 documentary series The Smash Brothers. His handle PC Chris comes from his hometown of Port Chester, New York.

Szygiel formerly held the record for receiving the largest prize check from a Melee tournament, winning $10,000 USD at MLG Las Vegas 2006. He held this record for about 9 years until Adam "Armada" Lindgren won EVO 2015, earning $11,214.  A 2021 list compiled by PGstats ranked PC Chris as the thirteenth-greatest Melee player of all time.

Career

MLG 2006
PC Chris started his MLG career by winning MLG New York Opener 2006, the first tournament in the MLG 2006 Pro Circuit, defeating Ken twice. However, at MLG Dallas 2006, he lost to Ken in winners' finals and then to ChuDat in losers' finals, placing 3rd. At MLG Anaheim 2006, he lost to ChuDat again in winners' semis, then defeated KoreanDJ, Isai, and ChuDat in losers' bracket, and won the first set of grand finals against Ken, but still lost the second set, placing 2nd. He lost to ChuDat and Azen at MLG Chicago 2006, placing 5th. PC Chris also won MELEE-FC6, defeating Mew2King in two consecutive sets during grand finals.

MLG Orlando 2006 proved to be his worst tournament in the season, as he lost to Azen and then to HugS early in losers' bracket, finishing at a disappointing 13th place. Despite this, his placement of 2nd at MLG New York Playoffs 2006, where he defeated ChuDat twice but lost to Azen twice, allowed him to qualify for the MLG 2006 championship. PC Chris eventually managed to win MLG Las Vegas 2006 and take the MLG 2006 championship, defeating Azen, Isai, and KoreanDJ twice. In 2007, PC Chris placed 4th at Cataclysm 3, losing to Mew2King and KoreanDJ, 3rd at MLG Long Island 2007, losing to Mew2King twice, 5th at Pound 2, losing to ChuDat and Mew2King, and 2nd at MELEE-FC Diamond, losing to Mew2King in two sets of grand finals. He did, however, win Zero Challenge 3, sweeping through losers' bracket and defeating Mew2King in two sets of grand finals after losing to Mew2King in winners' quarters.

EVO 2007 and retirement
PC Chris qualified for the EVO 2007 championship by placing 3rd at EVO East 2007 and 2nd at EVO West 2007. He eventually placed 4th at EVO World 2007. PC Chris's final three top performances were 5th at Viva La Smashtaclysm, losing to Azen and Mew2King, 3rd at Pound 3, losing to Mew2King and MaNg0, and 4th at Revival of Melee, losing to MaNg0 and DaShizWiz. PC Chris spent years in a semi-retired state; while he still participated in several national tournaments and usually made it into the bracket, his results were not nearly as notable as they once were. PC Chris explains his semi-retirement due to having to focus on a full-time job. After his retirement, PC still did play in a number of tournaments, including the national Apex 2012.

Return
On January 9, 2015, PC Chris posted a Tweet announcing his return to competitive Melee play. Shortly after, he attended Neo Nebulous Beta 2, where he placed 13th, and then made it into the pro bracket in the 2nd seed of his pool at Super Nebulous 2 on January 24, 2015. He lost to Ice first round, but was able to take Game 1, much to the shock of many. He then defeated Eikelmann in loser's before being defeated by Lord HDL 2–0 to get 17th.

PC Chris attended Apex 2015, where he nearly made bracket, placing 49th of 1,037 competitors. In it, he placed 2nd in his 1st round pool, losing only to Fuzzyness, a top-level European smasher. In 2nd round pools, he defeated players including Velocity and ROFL, and even had a close set with Kalamazhu, zero to death comboing him in the opening of Game 1. It went down to the last life Game 3, but PC Chris was eventually defeated, getting a huge cheer from the crowd on his exit. He later fought Ken in the Salty Suite, where he lost the first game as Fox but switched to Falco starting with game 2. The match went to Game 5 last stock, but PC Chris won it out 3-2 without getting hit on his last life. He was unable to attend EVO 2015.

Notable tournament placings
Only Majors and Supermajors are listed.

Personal life
In 2015 he was residing in The Bronx, New York.

References

External links

Super Smash Bros. Melee players
American esports players
People from Port Chester, New York
People from the Bronx
1987 births
Living people